The Nallin Farm House and the related Nallin Farm Springhouse and Bank Barn are located on Fort Detrick at Frederick, Maryland.

The Federal style brick farmhouse was built in stages between the 1780s and the 1830s and formerly served as the residence of the Fort Detrick commanding officer. It is known on post as "Building 1652".

The Nallin Farm was incorporated into Fort Detrick upon the post's expansion in 1955. It was added to the National Register of Historic Places on May 23, 1974.

References

External links
, including undated photo, at Maryland Historical Trust
Nallin Farmhouse, at Journey Through Hallowed Ground

Houses in Frederick County, Maryland
Houses on the National Register of Historic Places in Maryland
Fort Detrick
Farms on the National Register of Historic Places in Maryland
National Register of Historic Places in Frederick County, Maryland